Donald Hunter (born 1 April 1955) is a Scottish former professional football player who is best known for his time with Alloa Athletic.

Hunter joined Rangers in 1973 from Vale of Leven in the junior leagues. He was never to trouble Peter McCloy or Stewart Kennedy for the number one jersey at the club and soon moved on. In 1975, he was signed by Alex Ferguson for St Mirren, making over sixty league and cup appearances and winning the second division championship before moving on to Dumbarton. He then joined Alloa Athletic where he was to make the bulk of his league appearances, 124 in total, but retired from professional football to start a new career with Strathclyde Police.

External links

1955 births
Living people
Rangers F.C. players
St Mirren F.C. players
Dumbarton F.C. players
Alloa Athletic F.C. players
Association football goalkeepers
Scottish footballers